General elections were held in the Turks and Caicos Islands on 3 March 1988. They were the first after the suspension of the islands' constitution between 1986 and 1988, which followed Chief Minister Norman Saunders leaving office in March 1985 after being arrested on suspicion of drug smuggling (he was later found guilty and jailed) and the next Chief Minister Nathaniel Francis resigning in July 1986 after a British parliamentary inquiry accused him of corruption.

The result was a victory for the opposition People's Democratic Movement (PDM), which won eleven of the thirteen seats in the Legislative Council. Following the elections, PDM leader Oswald Skippings became Chief Minister. Malcolm Daniel, leader of the Progressive National Party (PNP) and Ariel Misick, leader of the National Democratic Alliance (NDA) both lost their seats.

Electoral system
The thirteen members of the Legislative Council were elected from five multi-member constituencies with two or three seats. The number of seats was increased from 11 in 1984.

Campaign
A total of 39 candidates contested the elections, with the PDM, PNP and NDA all running full slates of 13 candidates.

Results

References

Elections in the Turks and Caicos Islands
Turks
1988 in the Turks and Caicos Islands
Election and referendum articles with incomplete results
March 1988 events in North America